Anton Unterkofler (born 12 April 1983, in Schwarzach im Pongau) is an Austrian snowboarder, specializing in Alpine snowboarding.

Unterkofler competed at the 2014 Winter Olympics for Austria. He placed 22nd in qualifying for the parallel giant slalom, and 17th in the parallel slalom, not advancing in either event.

As of September 2014, his best showing at the World Championships is 5th, in the 2011 parallel giant slalom.

Unterkofler made his World Cup debut in January 2001. As of September 2014, he has one World Cup victory, in a parallel giant slalom at Carezza in 2013–14. His best overall finish is 11th, in 2007–08.

World Cup Podiums

References

1983 births
Living people
Olympic snowboarders of Austria
Snowboarders at the 2014 Winter Olympics
People from St. Johann im Pongau District
Austrian male snowboarders
Sportspeople from Salzburg (state)
21st-century Austrian people